Emancipation is any of various efforts to procuring political rights or equality.

Emancipation may refer to:
 Ecclesiastical emancipation
 Emancipation of minors
 Emancipation (Fuller), a statue located in Boston's Harriet Tubman Park
 Emancipation Proclamation (1863) declaring the end of legal slavery in the United States

Sports
 Emancipation (horse) (born 1979), a champion Australian thoroughbred racehorse

Film and TV
 Emancipation (2011 film), a German drama about domestic abuse on men
 Emancipation (2022 film), an American thriller about a black man's escape from slavery
 "Emancipation" (House), a 2008 episode of the medical drama television series
 "Emancipation" (Agents of S.H.I.E.L.D.)
 "Emancipation" (Stargate SG-1), an episode of the science fiction television series

Music
 Emancipator (musician) (born 1987), American electronic music producer
 Emancipation (Prince album), 1996
 Emancipation (Nu Virgos album), 2008
 "Emancipation", a song by Ihsahn from the album angL
 The Emancipation suite, a series of songs by Stratovarius from the 2009 album Polaris